Anahit A. Manasyan (born 24 June 1988 in Yerevan) is an Armenian constitutionalist, an adviser to the President of Armenia Constitutional Court as well as the Vice-Rector of the Academy of Justice of Armenia on Scientific Issues.

Education
Manasyan graduated from the Law Faculty of Yerevan State University gaining a master's degree in Constitutional Law in 2010. After graduation she continued her studies at Yerevan State University (YSU) as a Ph.D. student with the specialization on "Public Law – Constitutional, Administrative, Financial, Municipal, Environmental, European Law, Public Administration." In 2013 she defended her Ph.D. thesis – "The Place of the Constitutional Court Decisions in the Legal System of the Republic of Armenia and their Role in Ensuring the Stability of the Constitution" - and received the Ph.D. degree. From January to June 2016, Manasyan studied at the Fletcher School of Law and Diplomacy at Tufts University (USA).

Career
From 2008 to 2009, Manasyan worked as the Armenian Minister of Justice as an expert and from 2009 to 2013 served as assistant to the President at the Constitutional Court of Armenia. She was promoted to Constitutional Court adviser to the President in 2013. In February 2017, Manasyan was appointed as the Vice-Rector of the Academy of Justice of Armenia on Scientific Issues.

Since 2010, Manasyan has been working as a lecturer and chair at the Department of Constitutional Law, YSU and is an associate professor at the Chair of Constitutional Law, YSU. Since 2008 Manasyan has been a member of the Bar Association of Armenia and as of 2012 is a member of the editorial group of the Russian Annex to the Bulletin of the RA Constitutional Court, as well as a regional analyst for the international scientific journal Comparative Constitutional Review which is published in Moscow, Russia.

In 2012, Manasyan did internship at the Constitutional Court of Hungary' and in 2013 received training courses in Germany. She took part in several international conferences (including in Moscow, Saint-Petersburg, Vilnius, Minsk, Sarajevo, Berlin, Tbilisi), gave lectures within the frames of international seminars (including in Batumi, Budapest, Kyiv).

Since 2013 Manasyan has been a member of the editorial board of the South Caucasus Law Journal. Manasyan is a member (scientific secretary) of the professional council 001 on law at Yerevan State University of the Supreme Certifying Commission of Armenia, as well as a member of the Board of Trustees of the International Public Analytical Center Constitutional Culture.

She is an author and co-author of four monographs, two textbooks, as well as more than thirty scientific articles devoted to various issues of constitutional law, published in Armenian and foreign scientific journals.

References

1988 births
Living people
Armenian lawyers
Yerevan State University alumni
The Fletcher School at Tufts University alumni
Government ministers of Armenia